Sturt was an electoral district of the Legislative Assembly in the Australian state of New South Wales in the Broken Hill area. It was a single member electorate from 1889 to 1920.

Members for Sturt

History
Prior to 1889 Broken Hill was part of the district of Wentworth. The population in Wentworth had grown significantly since the 1880 redistribution, especially as a result of the growth of mining at Broken Hill. Under the formula for seats, Wentworth was due to return 3 members. Because of the large area covered by the district, in 1889 it was split into 3, Wentworth, Sturt and Wilcannia. In 1894 Sturt became a rural district, with the towns of Broken Hill and Alma (now known as South Broken Hill) in the eponymous districts of Broken Hill and Alma. In 1904 Alma was absorbed into Broken Hill. At the 1912 redistribution Sturt was recast, absorbing north Broken Hill, and the western part of the abolished district of The Darling, including the town of Tibooburra. South Broken Hill, the southern part of Sturt were combined in the new district of Willyama, along with the north western part of Murray.

In 1920 Sturt was combined with Cobar, Willyama and much of the area of Murray to create a three-member electorate, elected by proportional representation. At the time it was one of the largest electoral districts in the world, said to be 121,000 square miles, with votes having to be brought sometimes 500 miles by the primitive transportation of the time to the central counting place. But proportional representation pundits as far as away as Canada revelled in STV's successful implementation under such conditions.

In 1927, it became a single member electorate, but was renamed Broken Hill in 1968.

An entirely different district was created in 1971, containing the town of Narrandera and replacing parts of Albury, Murray, Murrumbidgee and Temora. It was abolished in 1981 and replaced by Albury, Lachlan, Murray, Murrumbidgee and Wagga Wagga.

Election results

References

Former electoral districts of New South Wales
Constituencies established in 1889
1889 establishments in Australia
Constituencies disestablished in 1968
1968 disestablishments in Australia
Constituencies established in 1971
1971 establishments in Australia
Constituencies disestablished in 1981
1981 disestablishments in Australia